Walter Leslie Runciman, 2nd Viscount Runciman of Doxford,  (26 August 1900 – 1 September 1989) was a prominent member of the Runcimans, a well-known Newcastle ship-owning and political family.

Background
Runciman was the eldest son of the politician Walter Runciman (later Walter Runciman, 1st Viscount Runciman of Doxford) and Hilda Stevenson. He was born in Newcastle upon Tyne and grew up at Doxford Hall. He was educated at Summer Fields School, Eton College and Trinity College, Cambridge. In 1937 he was awarded the Air Force Cross. He was awarded the OBE in 1946 for war service. On his father's death in 1949 he succeeded to the title Viscount Runciman of Doxford (created in 1937).

Career
After graduating from Cambridge, Leslie Runciman joined the family shipping business, later becoming chairman of the company. He trained as a pilot and was Commanding Officer of No. 607 (County of Durham) Squadron of the Auxiliary Air Force from 1930 to 1939. He also partnered with Constance Leathart in forming Cramlington Aircraft Ltd, which ran Cramlington Aerodrome as well as producing a primary glider in the early 1930s. From 1940 to 1943, he was the first Director-General of the British Overseas Airways Corporation (BOAC). From then until 1946, he was Air Attaché in Tehran. Post-war Runciman served on many business and public organisations mainly related to shipping and air transport. He was a Trustee of the National Maritime Museum at Greenwich from 1955, acting as chairman from 1962 to 1972. A lifelong yachtsman, he was Commodore of the Royal Yacht Squadron from 1968 to 1974 and of Royal Northumberland Yacht Club from 1946 to 1976 when he was promoted Admiral for life.

Family
Walter Leslie Runciman married novelist Rosamond Nina Lehmann in 1923. They were divorced in 1928 and he remarried Katherine Schuyler Garrison in 1932. Their only child, the Hon Walter Garrison Runciman, later 3rd Viscount Runciman of Doxford was born in 1934. Leslie Runciman was the elder brother of the distinguished historian, the Honourable Sir Steven Runciman.

Honours
 1937: Air Force Cross
 1946: Officer of the Order of the British Empire
 1949: Baronet, 3rd baronet, of Doxford (cr.1906 )

Honorary military appointments
 1939–1957: Honorary Air Commodore, 607 (County of Durham) Squadron, RAuxAF

Arms

References

External links

Leslie Runciman, 2nd Viscount Runciman of Doxford
1900 births
1989 deaths
People educated at Eton College
Alumni of Trinity College, Cambridge
Viscounts in the Peerage of the United Kingdom
People educated at Summer Fields School